The 1922–23 J. & P. Coats F.C. season was the second season for the club in the American Soccer League. The club won the league.

American Soccer League

Pld = Matches played; W = Matches won; D = Matches drawn; L = Matches lost; GF = Goals for; GA = Goals against; Pts = Points

National Challenge Cup

American Cup

Exhibitions

Notes and references
Bibliography

Footnotes

J. & P. Coats F.C.
American Soccer League (1921–1933) seasons
J. & P. Coats F.C.